Devghat is one of the famous religious and cultural centers in central Nepal. At the time of the 1991 Nepal census it had a population of 5786 people living in 1132 individual households.

The town is located at the junction of the Seti Gandaki and Krishna Gandaki rivers, and is one of the holiest places in Hindu mythology as well as a holy place for Hindu gods.

Transportation
Bus service is available from the Pokhara bus station in Narayangarh city while private taxis and cars can be hired in the city.

Religious sites
Devghat is home to various temples and caves dedicated to Hindu gods, goddesses, and saints including Goddess Sita's cave. In Makar Sankranti, huge melas (gatherings) are observed each year making it one of the largest religious melas in Nepal. The date when this festival started remains unknown. Hindu pilgrims bathe at the junction of the Krishna Gandaki river well known for its rare 'Saligram Sheela (holy stone), which Hindu devotees worship as Lord Vishnu.

Modern development
Devghat has three high schools, one post-graduate college, three retirement home projects, one ayurvedic health station, part of Bharatpur medical college, the guest house of B P Koirala Memorial Cancer Hospital etc. Volunteers from various health organizations provide free health check up camps on a regular basis. A historic suspension bridge connects the Tanahun and Chitwan districts of the town.

The government of Nepal has established Devghat Area Development Committee for the integrated development of this area while the non-resident Nepalese Association has established a project to construct 200 retirement homes in the Chitwan district of the town.

A proposed Saptagandaki hydropower plant is in the pipeline for construction. It is expected that living standards in the area will improve if the project goes ahead through religious tourism.

Devghat Area Development committee has started constructing Hindu end of life ritual sites, with economic assistance from the Government of Nepal.

Institutions

Education
 Mahesh Sanskrit Gurkul bidhyapeeth (Mahabidhyalaya): Post-graduate college affiliated with Nepal Sanskrit University. Various Sanskrit specialties are taught in this boarding institution.
 Sita Ram Sanskrit Secondary School: Established in 1979 in the Chitwan district of Devghat it has its own free hostel facility. Students are offered scholarships if they do well in the examinations.
 Kalika higher Secondary School: Located in the Tanahun district.

Health care 

 Devghat Center for Healing Arts: is an outpatient clinic established under the auspices of Late Gunanidhi Khanal Memorial Trust. There is growing concern that this institution must be expanded and developed as a Senior Citizen Hospital to fulfill the growing health care need of the senior citizen. Goal of the hospital is to provide emergency, acute inpatient, outpatient, rehabilitative, supportive and ancillary care under one roof with improved coordination of the care for the excellent health care outcome. Senior citizen hospital will be medical home for the elderly patient which will provide preventative, curative and rehabilitative approach. Alternative medicine like Ayurveda, naturopathy, yoga will also be practiced in a healing and soothing environment. Local dignitaries, professional and peoples are expecting help from everybody including local, state, federal government, INGO, NGO and communities to make this plan realistic very soon. Association of Nepali Physician in America/Himalayan Health Initiative have promised to support this clinic.
 Devghat Ayurveda Health Post: Located in the Chitwan district, it is the oldest health post in this area providing both traditional and ayurvedic modes of treatment to local people.

Retirement homes
 Devghat Development Committee operated Old Age Home: The oldest retirement home in this area run by a state owned organization with a capacity of around 150 beds.
 Rotary International operated Old Age Home: Located in the Chitwan district.
 NRN Briddhashram: Currently under construction by the Non-Resident Nepalese Association to have a 200-bed capacity.

Women rights
Devghat Ama Samuha, Chitwan is a NGO established in Chitwan, Devghat which has been deeply involved in the advocacy of the women's rights. Goal of this institution is to completely abolish all forms of violence, aggression and discrimination against women and encourage equal educational, socioeconomic, cultural and religious opportunities to women.

Media 
To promote local culture, Devghat has one FM radio station - Radio Devghat, broadcasting on 102.6 MHz, which is a Community radio Station.

Devghat area religious trekking
Trekking route is under construction which will connect Devghat with other holy shrines and important tourist destinations around this area.

References 

Populated places in Tanahun District
Hindu pilgrimage sites in Nepal
Ghats of Nepal